USNS Laramie (T-AO-203) is a  underway replenishment oiler operated by the Military Sealift Command to support ships of the United States Navy.

Laramie, the seventeenth ship of the Henry J. Kaiser class, was laid down at Avondale Shipyard, Inc., at New Orleans, Louisiana, on 10 January 1994 and launched on 6 May 1995. She was one of only three of the eighteen Henry J. Kaiser-class ships—the other two being USNS Patuxent (T-AO-201) and USNS Rappahannock (T-AO-204)—to be built with a double bottom in order to meet the requirements of the Oil Pollution Act of 1990.

Laramie entered non-commissioned U.S. Navy service under the control of the Military Sealift Command with a primarily civilian crew on 7 May 1996, the last of the eighteen Henry J. Kaiser-class ships to enter service. She serves in the United States Atlantic Fleet.

Design
The Henry J. Kaiser-class replenishment oilers were preceded by the shorter Cimarron class.

They were built without armaments but can be fitted with close-in weapon systems. The ship has a helicopter platform but not any maintenance facilities. It has a complement of eighty-nine civilians (nineteen officers), twenty-nine spare crew, and six United States Navy crew.

References

Bibliography

External links

 NavSource Online: Service Ship Photo Archive: USNS Laramie (T-AO-203)
 USNS Laramie (T-AO-203)

 

Henry J. Kaiser-class oilers
Ships built in Bridge City, Louisiana
1995 ships